Cheshmeh Kareh may refer to:
Cheshmeh Kareh, Sonqor, Kermanshah Province
Cheshmeh Kareh, Khorramabad, Lorestan Province